Paul McKenna (born 8 November 1963) is a British hypnotist, behavioural scientist, television and radio broadcaster and author of self-help books.

McKenna has written and produced books and multimedia products, hosted self-improvement television shows and presents seminars in hypnosis, neuro-linguistic programming, weight loss, motivation and the Zen meditation Big Mind and Amygdala Depotentiation Therapy (ADT), otherwise known as Havening Techniques.

Early Life
McKenna was born in Enfield, London to a builder and a home economics teacher. He attended St Ignatius' College. He was routinely bullied by his teachers for his dyslexia.

Career

Show business
McKenna started off in radio aged 16 at Radio Topshop, and went on to present for stations including  Radio Caroline and Capital London.

He became interested in hypnotism as a result of a guest who appeared on his show. His interest stemmed initially for reasons of self-development, although he discovered that there was an entertainment aspect that he could develop which would expose more of the public to the power of hypnosis.  He was taught hypnosis by American practitioner Richard Bandler, with whom he continued to work closely for many years. While working at Capital Radio, McKenna began experimenting with small hypnotic shows, first for the amusement of friends, then for audiences in locations like pubs and clubs, UK military bases, and university events. From there he starred in a regular Sunday night show at the Duke of York's Theatre, which was owned at the time by Capital Radio. The success of those shows led to his playing other theatres across the UK, Ireland, the Netherlands, the US, Australia, and Hong Kong.

After several years presenting at Radio 1 in the early 1990s, McKenna decided to branch out from radio. In the 1990s, McKenna presented a number of TV programmes including The Hypnotic World of Paul McKenna (1993–97), The Paranormal World of Paul McKenna (1996–97) and Hyp the Streets (1999). He won the TRIC (Television & Radio Industry Club) Award for Best TV Newcomer in 1994 From small-time radio DJ to TV star attracting millions of viewers around the world  During this time, he continued his studies of hypnosis and neuro-linguistic programming with the US psychologist Richard Bandler, the co-creator of the advanced behavioural science technique abbreviated to NLP.

McKenna hypnotised the Top Gear presenter Richard Hammond on series 4, episode 2 of the motor show in 2004.  In October 2009 he was a guest on Private Passions, the biographical music discussion programme on BBC Radio 3.

From February 2014 to September 2015, McKenna hosted a talk show called McKenna  broadcast on Hulu featuring "non-journalistic" interviews with Simon Cowell, Ryan Seacrest, Roger Moore, Rachael Ray, Tony Robbins and Richard Dawkins.

Research
McKenna specialises in working with PTSD, severe trauma, pain control and emotional overwhelm.

McKenna was also involved in a research study conducted by Professor Neil Greenberg of The Royal College of Psychiatrists Lead for Military and Veterans’ Health.

Self help career
McKenna’s interest in hypnosis, neuro-linguistic programming and other self-improvement techniques has resulted in him becoming an author of self-help and personal development books.

Many of McKenna's one-to-one hypnotherapy clients are celebrities. He helped Daryl Hannah cope with stage fright when she starred in The Seven Year Itch. According to a book by McKenna, Rob Brydon claims that McKenna helped alleviate his fear of flying, Stephen Fry advocated McKenna's weight loss strategies and David Walliams used McKenna to help with his swim across the English Channel.

McKenna has focused on teaching people how to "deprogramme" their sugar cravings, claiming "sugar is the most dangerous drug in the world".

Libel lawsuits

The Star & National Enquirer
In 1999, McKenna successfully sued both The Star and National Enquirer for libel after they published articles that alleged that he had damaged the mental health of a man that he hypnotised in one of his shows. Both lawsuits resulted in six-figure settlements. The man had sued McKenna in a previous trial, but the judge dismissed that lawsuit after concluding that there was no evidence that McKenna's stage hypnosis posed any risk to those taking part.

Daily Mirror
In 1996, McKenna was granted a PhD from LaSalle University in Louisiana. It was legally licensed by the state, but it falsely claimed to be an accredited institution. The school exempted McKenna from coursework based on his prior works, and his dissertation was producing a series of self-help tapes that eventually became a book, Change Your Life in Seven Days. Discovery of this lack of accreditation prompted McKenna to obtain another PhD from International Management Centres Association in 2003.

In 2006, McKenna successfully sued the Daily Mirror for libel over claims made by former Mirror TV critic Victor Lewis-Smith that McKenna's degree from LaSalle was merely a purchased "bogus degree" bought with the intention of deliberately defrauding the public. McKenna won the case, and the newspaper was ordered to pay £75,000 in costs. Mr. Justice Eady (the judge), stated that while the scholarly characterisation of the degree was "another matter", McKenna did not believe the degree was "bogus or that he [had] misled anyone in allowing himself to be referred to as a PhD."

List of published works

 Control Stress Hay House 2017 
 Supercharge Your Intelligence Today! Hay House 2017 
 Get Control of Sugar Now! Hay House 2017 
 The 3 Things That Will Change Your Destiny Today! Hay House 2016 
 Freedom from Emotional Eating Hay House 2015 
 Instant Influence and Charisma Transworld 2015 
 Hypnotic Gastric Band Bantam Press 2013 
 I Can Make You Smarter Bantam Press 2012 
 I Can Make You Happy Bantam Press: 2011 
 Change Your Life in Seven Days - Updated version Bantam Press: 2010 
 I Can Make You Confident, Sterling Publishing: 2010. 
 I Can Make You Sleep, Bantam Press: 2009. 
 Control Stress Stop Worrying and Feel Good Now!, Bantam Press: 2009. 
 I Can Make You Rich, Bantam Press: 2007. 
 Quit Smoking Today Without Gaining Weight, Bantam Press: 2007. 
 Instant Confidence, Bantam Press: 2006. 
 I Can Make You Thin 90-Day Success Journal, Bantam Press: 2006. 
 I Can Make You Thin, Bantam Press: 2005. 
 Change Your Life in Seven Days, 2005.
 How to Mend Your Broken Heart, (with Hugh Willbourn) Bantam Press: 2003. 
 The Power to Influence, Nightingale-Conant: 1998.  (audiobook with Michael Breen)
 The Paranormal World of Paul McKenna, Faber and Faber: 1997. 
 Paul McKenna's Hypnotic Secrets, Boxtree: 1995.  (with Peter Willis and Clare Staples)
 Hypno Slim, Sunday Books: 1994. 
 The Hypnotic World of Paul McKenna, Faber and Faber: 1994.

References

External links
 
 

1963 births
Living people
British hypnotists
English radio presenters
English television presenters
English writers
Neuro-linguistic programming writers
People educated at St Ignatius' College, Enfield
People from Enfield, London
Offshore radio broadcasters
People from Hackney Central